Atyanas (d. 62 BC) was a nobleman and champion boxer from Adramyttium in Mysia. His father's name was Hippocrates. Atyanas won the boxing competition in 72 BC and is listed in Phlegon's summary of the 177th Olympiad. Cicero says that he was killed by pirates while L. Valerius Flaccus was governor of Asia.

References

Further reading
 C.E.W. Steel, Cicero, Rhetoric, and Empire (Oxford University Press, 2001), pp. 56–58 online.

Roman-era Olympic competitors
People killed by pirates